Ewald "Lefty" Pyle (August 27, 1910 – January 10, 2004) was a Major League Baseball pitcher. Pyle played for the St. Louis Browns in 1939 and again in 1942, and the Washington Senators, New York Giants and the Boston Braves from 1943 to 1945.

References

External links

1910 births
2004 deaths
St. Louis Browns players
Washington Senators (1901–1960) players
New York Giants (NL) players
Boston Braves players
Major League Baseball pitchers
Baseball players from Missouri